The Masque of Mandragora is the first serial of the 14th season of the British science fiction television series Doctor Who, which was first broadcast in four weekly parts on BBC1 from 4 to 25 September 1976.

The serial is set in the fictional European duchy of San Martino in the late 15th century. In the serial, the astrologer Hieronymous (Norman Jones) seeks to summon the power of an intelligence called the Mandragora Helix to rule the Earth.

Plot

The Doctor shows Sarah some of the TARDIS interior, and they come across the secondary console room. Activating the viewscreen, the Doctor sees a swirl of living energy in the time vortex – the Mandragora Helix, which starts to draw them in. The intelligence within the Helix psychically attacks them as the Doctor tries to pilot the TARDIS through it. The ship ends up inside the Helix, and the Doctor and Sarah duck behind the TARDIS as a fragment of glowing Helix energy flies by. They escape in the TARDIS, not knowing that the fragment has entered with them.

In 15th century San Martino in Italy, a peasant revolt is violently put down by Count Federico and his men, led by Captain Rossini. In a palace, Federico's brother, the Duke of San Martino, lies dying, attended to by his son Giuliano and Giuliano's companion Marco. The Duke's death had been foretold by Hieronymous, the court astrologer, but Giuliano, a man of science, does not believe in such superstition. In fact, Hieronymous is working for Federico, and the horoscope's prediction of the Duke's death was helped along by poison. Hieronymous tells the Count that he feels his powers are growing, but all Federico wants is for the astrologer to foretell Giuliano's death next, and he will take care of the rest.

The TARDIS materialises in a field near San Martino, and when the Doctor and Sarah exit, the energy fragment flies out of the TARDIS, unseen. Sarah wanders off and is kidnapped by a group of men in hooded robes. The Doctor tries to rescue her but is knocked out, and when he awakes he witnesses the energy fragment fly towards and kill a peasant. Searching for Sarah, the Doctor is confronted by the Count's men and arrested.

At the court, the Doctor tells Federico that the energy fragment could spell the end of the world. The Count at first thinks the Doctor is a seer, like Hieronymous, but when the astrologer quizzes the Doctor, it becomes clear that the Doctor does not believe in any of it. Federico orders the Doctor to be executed as a spy. Meanwhile, Sarah is brought before a priest and told that she is the foretold sacrifice to Demnos, the Roman god of moonlight and solstice. In the palace courtyard, the Doctor is led to the executioner.

Before the executioner's sword lands, the Doctor unfurls his scarf and hooks it around the executioner's ankle, throwing him off balance. The Doctor escapes and finds his way into catacombs beneath the city. The guards, fearing the Brethren of Demnos who reside there, stop their pursuit. Inside, Sarah is laid out on an altar. A purple-robed figure is about to stab her when the Doctor snatches Sarah away, just as the fragment appears in the chamber, suffusing it with a red glow and providing a distraction for the two to escape.

Giuliano examines the body of a guard who was killed earlier by the fragment, and while he does not know the cause of the guard's death, he dismisses ideas that it was some kind of fire demon. The Doctor and Sarah are found by palace guards. In the temple, the Helix manifests itself as a pillar of red light and tells the purple-robed figure that he will be given undreamed-of powers to carry out its will on Earth and become the planet's supreme ruler. After the Helix vanishes, the figure removes his mask, revealing the face of Hieronymous.

The guards take the Doctor and Sarah to Giuliano, who shows him the dead guard's body and tells the Doctor of fears that if Federico rules San Martino, all knowledge and learning will be suppressed. Elsewhere, Federico discovers that Giuliano has invited several nobles to San Martino to celebrate his succession to the Dukedom. Angered, Federico demands Hieronymous make up a new horoscope and poison Giuliano before the next evening.

The Doctor deduces that the Helix chose San Martino because the Brethren provided a ready-made power base.  The Doctor asserts that the 15th century was the transition between the Dark Ages and the dawn of the Renaissance – the Helix could gain control of the Earth now through a new religion. The Doctor tells Giuliano the temple must be destroyed. They go to the temple, and the Doctor enters the catacombs alone. Giuliano tells Sarah that he and a few others believe that the earth is a sphere (although that was common knowledge of the day).

As the Doctor enters the main chamber the Helix attacks him psychically. Rossini informs Federico of Giuliano's trip to the temple, and the Count decides to kill his "pagan" nephew. The guards corner Giuliano and attack. Sarah runs into the catacombs calling for the Doctor, but is caught by the Brethren.

The Helix attack stops, but the Doctor is prevented from venturing further into the temple. He leaves to find Giuliano fighting the guards and joins in. Giuliano is wounded and the Brethren emerge from the forest and force the guards to retreat. The Doctor and Giuliano enter the catacombs. Sarah is brought back to the astrologer's chambers where she is left gagged as the Priest and Hieronymous talk. The priest is eager to sacrifice Sarah, but Hieronymous decides to use her as bait for the Doctor. Hieronymous allowed the Brethren to save Giuliano because the young prince may still have value. Sarah is hypnotised to believe the Doctor is an evil sorcerer. Hieronymous gives her a poisoned needle to kill the Doctor.

At the palace, the invited nobles arrive and Federico realizes he does not have much time to eliminate Giuliano, but Rossini is unable to find Giuliano. Hieronymous warns Federico that his life is in danger. Federico scoffs, believing Hieronymous a fraud, but is suspicious enough to tell Rossini to banish Hieronymous from the city.

In the catacombs, Giuliano and the Doctor find Sarah, who cannot remember anything after her capture by the cult. They reach the palace dungeons through a secret passage. The Doctor confronts Hieronymous, whom he has deduced is the leader of the Brethren. Sarah secretly follows. When the Doctor speaks to Hieronymous, Sarah sneaks up behind him with the needle, but the Doctor snaps her out of the trance, just as the guards come for Hieronymous. The astrologer escapes, but the guards capture the Doctor, Sarah, and Giuliano.

In the dungeons, Federico accuses the prisoners of being followers of Demnos. Rossini rushes in, informing the Count that members of the Brethren are moving towards the temple. The Doctor tries to convince Federico that Hieronymous is the real threat. Federico takes the Doctor with him and some guards, leaving the others as hostages. In the temple, Hieronymous summons the Helix, which begins infusing him and his followers with power. Disguised in hoods, the Doctor, Federico and the guards enter and witness the ceremony. Federico steps forward, calls Hieronymous a traitor, and rips off the golden mask, only to reveal glowing energy in place of a face. Hieronymous raises a finger, and electrical energy stabs out at the Count, reducing him to ashes.

Hieronymous then fires at and kills the guards but does not seem to have seen the Doctor. The Doctor joins the circle around the Helix as Hieronymous announces that Mandragora will swallow the moon the next evening and then the Brethren will strike. The Doctor slips away unnoticed. In the palace dungeons, Rossini is about to kill the prisoners when the Doctor arrives and reveals that Federico is dead. The guards change their allegiance to Giuliano and take Rossini into custody. The Doctor observes that the Brethren are still a danger. He tells Giuliano to fortify the palace in preparation for their attack.

In the meantime, the Brethren are driving people out of the city, isolating the palace. Giuliano wants to cancel the masque that will celebrate his accession, but Marco is confident they can defend the palace against the Brethren. The Doctor calculates there will be a lunar eclipse that evening – Mandragora swallowing the Moon – and when the Helix takes over, it will remove all sense of purpose from mankind. Right now, however, the Helix energy is spread thinly over all the Brethren, and it could be exhausted. He asks Giuliano for a breastplate and a length of wire. Wearing the breastplate under his coat, if he has guessed right about the nature of Helix energy, he could drain it off.

Hieronymous knows of a secret way into the palace, and he intends to infiltrate his men under cover of the masque. The Doctor enters the temple and grounds the altar with wire. Hieronymous addresses the Doctor as "Time Lord", and says that Earth has to be possessed; if mankind's ambition is not checked, it will eventually spread into the Galaxy and the powers of Mandragora will not allow a rival within their domain. Hieronymous fires repeated bolts of energy into the Doctor's chest, knocking him back painfully, but the Doctor survives.

At the masque, the Brethren make their appearance, and the masqueraders run about in panic as they fire into the crowd. Hieronymous then appears and tells the Brethren to take the others into the temple for the final sacrifice. The Moon goes into eclipse, and the Brethren place their hands on the altar as a ball of Helix energy descends. However, it consumes the Brethren, expanding and then fading away. "Hieronymous" removes his mask – it was the Doctor, imitating the cult leader's voice. The Doctor explains it as a case of "energy squared", putting the Mandragora Helix back where it came from.

The Doctor and Sarah make their goodbyes to Giuliano. Just before they leave the Doctor tells Sarah that while Giuliano will not have any more trouble with Mandragora, humanity will. The constellation will be in position at about the end of the 20th century.

Production

Working titles for this story included The Catacombs of Death and The Curse of Mandragora. The ultimate name references the masque, entertainment performed by masked players, that later plays a key role in the plot.

Location shooting for the serial was done at the resort of Portmeirion in Wales, better known as the setting for the cult series The Prisoner.

Cast notes
Tim Pigott-Smith previously played Captain Harker in The Claws of Axos (1971). Norman Jones previously played Khrisong in The Abominable Snowmen (1967) and Major Baker in Doctor Who and the Silurians (1970). Robert James had previously played Lesterson in The Power of the Daleks (1966).

Themes and analysis
Martin Wiggins, senior lecturer and fellow at the Shakespeare Institute at Stratford-upon-Avon, has compared this story's plot with Hamlet: "It has an inexperienced, intellectual prince, a usurping duke, and a debate about the conflict between science and religion that recalls Hamlet's musings on the nature of the supernatural world."

Broadcast and reception

Paul Cornell, Martin Day, and Keith Topping wrote of the serial in The Discontinuity Guide (1995), "One of the few metaphors in Doctor Who history (nasty alien energy mass = superstition and scientific ignorance) is blurred by the lack of actual scientific understanding that the story exhibits. Looks and sounds great, though." In The Television Companion (1998), David J. Howe and Stephen James Walker reported that viewers had a mixed reaction to the serial, according to the BBC's Audience Research Report, but there had been a majority of "moderate approval". Howe and Walker themselves commended the "very well written and highly intelligent" scripts, the "polished production", and strong cast. In 2010, Patrick Mulkern of Radio Times described the serial as "polished" with "an air of confidence in the writing and performances". He praised the masked ball ending and the costumes and music, and remarked that "perhaps the only feeble note is the representation of the Helix". DVD Talk's Ian Jane gave The Masque of Mandragora three and a half out of five stars, calling it "pretty entertaining stuff". While he felt that "it's a bit predictable and most of the supporting cast is surprisingly poorly defined", he praised Baker and the atmosphere of the serial and wrote that ultimately the good outweighs the bad.

Commercial releases

In print

A novelisation of this serial, written by Philip Hinchcliffe, was published by Target Books in December 1977. A French translation of it was published in 1987. An unabridged reading of the novelisation read by Tim Pigott-Smith was released by BBC Audiobooks in April 2009.

Home media
This story was released on VHS in August 1991, on DVD on 8 February 2010, and as part of the Season 14 Collection on Bluray on 4 May 2020. This serial was also released as part of the Doctor Who DVD Files in issue 64 on 15 June 2011.

References

External links

Target novelisation

Fourth Doctor serials
Doctor Who pseudohistorical serials
Doctor Who serials novelised by Philip Hinchcliffe
Television episodes set in Italy
1976 British television episodes
Fiction set in the 15th century